The R.R. Gardner House is a historic house located in South Kingstown, Rhode Island.

Description and history 
The -story wood-frame house was built in 1896 and extended in the early 20th century with an ell to the rear. The main block has a cross-gable roof configuration, and features the irregular styling that typifies the then popular Queen Anne style. The house is a local example of a country estate house built in a rural setting. The property includes a barn that is contemporary to the house, to which an older Cape-style farmhouse is connected, and a former one-room schoolhouse which was converted into a caretaker's residence.

The house was listed on the National Register of Historic Places on November 21, 1996.

See also
National Register of Historic Places listings in Washington County, Rhode Island

References

Houses on the National Register of Historic Places in Rhode Island
Houses in South Kingstown, Rhode Island
National Register of Historic Places in Washington County, Rhode Island
Houses completed in 1896
Queen Anne architecture in Rhode Island